Viscount Galway is a title that has been created once in the Peerage of England and thrice in the Peerage of Ireland. The first creation came in the Peerage of England in 1628 in favour of Richard Burke, 4th Earl of Clanricarde. He was made Earl of St Albans at the same time (see the Earl of Clanricarde for more information on this creation). The second creation came in the Peerage of Ireland in 1687 in favour of Ulick Bourke. He was made Baron Tyaquin at the same time, also in the Peerage of Ireland. However, both titles became extinct on his early death in 1691. The third creation came in the Peerage of Ireland in 1692 in favour of the French soldier and diplomat Henry de Massue, Marquis de Ruvigny, who was created Baron Portarlington, also in the Peerage of Ireland, at the same time. He was made Earl of Galway in 1697. However, both titles became extinct on his death in 1720.

The fourth creation came in the Peerage of Ireland in 1727 when John Monckton was made Baron Killard, of the County of Clare, and Viscount Galway. He represented Clitheroe and Pontefract in the British House of Commons and served as Surveyor General of Woods and Forests in England and Wales. His son, the second Viscount, sat as a Member of Parliament for Pontefract and Thirsk. In 1769 he assumed by Royal licence the additional surname of Arundell. His son, the third Viscount, briefly represented Pontefract in Parliament. He was succeeded by his younger brother, the fourth Baron, who also sat for Pontefract as well as for Yorkshire. His son, the fifth Viscount, discontinued the use of the surname of Arundell by Royal licence in 1826 and instead obtained permission for each successive holder of the title and his eldest son to use the surnames Monckton-Arundell while the younger branches of the family should use Monckton only.

His son, the sixth Viscount, sat for many years as the Conservative Member of Parliament for East Retford. His son, the seventh Viscount, represented Nottinghamshire North in the House of Commons as a Conservative and was also an Aide-de-Camp to Queen Victoria, King Edward VII and King George V. In 1887 he was created Baron Monckton, of Serlby in the County of Nottingham, in the Peerage of the United Kingdom, which gave him and his descendants an automatic seat in the House of Lords. His son, the eighth Viscount, was Governor-General of New Zealand from 1935 to 1941.

He was succeeded by his son, the ninth Viscount. On his early death in 1971, he had no direct male heir. His landownings passed to his daughter Charlotte (the Hon. Mrs Charlotte Townsend of Melbury House). The barony of Monckton of Serlby became extinct while he was succeeded in the Irish titles by his second cousin once removed, the tenth Viscount. He was the grandson of the Hon. Edmund Gambier Monckton, fourth son of the fifth Viscount, and as he was a member of a younger branch of the family he was named only Monckton, in accordance with the rules obtained by the fifth Viscount. However, he adopted by Royal licence the surname Arundell on his succession for himself and for all successive holders of the title. On the death in 1980 of his younger brother, the eleventh Viscount, this line of the family also failed. He was succeeded by his second cousin once removed, the twelfth Viscount, who was born in Canada. In 2017 he was succeeded by his only son, the thirteenth Viscount, present holder of the titles, who is the great-grandson of Marmaduke John Monckton, third son of the Hon. Edmund Gambier Monckton, fourth son of the fifth Viscount. Lord Galway lives in Canada and represented Canada as a rower in the 1984 Summer Olympics.

Papers of the Viscounts Galway are held at Manuscripts and Special Collections, The University of Nottingham.

The family seat was Serlby Hall, in Bassetlaw, Nottinghamshire.

Viscounts Galway, first creation (1628)
See the Earl of Clanricarde

Viscounts Galway, second creation (1687)
Ulick Bourke, 1st Viscount Galway (1670–1691)

Viscounts Galway, third creation (1692), and Earl of Galway (1697)
Henri de Massue, Marquis de Ruvigny, 1st Viscount Galway (1648–1720)

Viscounts Galway, fourth creation (1727)
John Monckton, 1st Viscount Galway (1695–1751)
William Monckton-Arundell, 2nd Viscount Galway (d.1772)
Henry William Monckton-Arundell, 3rd Viscount Galway (1749–1774)
Robert Monckton-Arundell, 4th Viscount Galway (1752–1810)
William George Monckton-Arundell, 5th Viscount Galway (1782–1834)
George Edward Arundell Monckton-Arundell, 6th Viscount Galway (1805–1876)
George Edmund Milnes Monckton-Arundell, 7th Viscount Galway (1844–1931)
George Vere Arundel Monckton-Arundell, 8th Viscount Galway (1882–1943)
Simon George Robert Monckton-Arundell, 9th Viscount Galway (1929–1971)
William Arundell Monckton-Arundell, 10th Viscount Galway (1894–1977)
Edmund Savile Monckton-Arundell, 11th Viscount Galway (1900–1980)
George Rupert Monckton-Arundell, 12th Viscount Galway (1922–2017)
John Philip Monckton-Arundell, 13th Viscount Galway (born 1952)

The heir apparent is Geoffrey Taylor Black Monckton-Arundell (born 1996)

References

Sources

Kidd, Charles, Williamson, David (editors). Debrett's Peerage and Baronetage (1990 edition). New York: St Martin's Press, 1990.

External links

Papers of the Viscounts Galway and their predecessors, held at Manuscripts and Special Collections at The University of Nottingham

Viscountcies in the Peerage of Ireland
Extinct viscountcies in the Peerage of Ireland
Noble titles created in 1628
Noble titles created in 1687
Noble titles created in 1692
Noble titles created in 1727